The 2020 UNAF Women's Tournament is the 2nd edition of the UNAF Women's Tournament, an association football tournament open to the women's national teams of UNAF member countries. The tournament took place in Tunisia. Of the five UNAF member countries, Libya and Egypt chose not to participate in the competition. Mauritania and Tanzania were invited to replace the two withdrawal teams.

Participants

Venues

Squads

Tournament
All times are local, CAT (UTC+1).

Matches

Final ranking

Goalscorers
5 goals
 Mwanahamisi Shurua

4 goals
 Ghizlane Chebbak

2 goals

 Imene Merrouche
 Salma Amani
 Sanaâ Mssoudy

1 goal

 Houria Affak
 Hanna Boubezari
 Ferial Daoui
 Anissa Dellidj
 Kenza Hadjar
 Soulef Kacem
 Nour Imane Addi
 Ibtissam Jraidi
 Hayat Khirou
 Amina Bellali
 Opa Clement
 Onikia Kasunga
 Diana Lucas Misua
 Aisha Masaka
 Fatouma Saloum
 Kadushu Shabami
 Jolita Singanu
 Chaima Ben Mohamed
 Mariem Houij
 Yasmine Jemai
 Soumaya Laamiri
 Imen Mchara

References

External links
 اتحاد شمال افريقيا لكرة القدم ينظم دورة منتخبات الكبريات من 13 الى 23 فيفري بتونس – UNAF official website

UNAF Women's Tournament
2020 in African football
Arab
International association football competitions hosted by Tunisia
UNAF Women's